Baba Banda Singh Bahadur Inter State Bus Terminus or Mohali Bus Stand is an India's first air conditioned bus station located in the sector 56-57 (Phase VI) of Mohali city. It will have 1844 Punjab Roadways buses with 1810 ordinary and 34 super integral coach AC buses.

Services
The Mohali bus stand will have Terminal A, Terminal B and Terminal C. Other facilities includes the food court, ticket counters, retail outlets, free wi-fi, ATMs, cyber cafes, medical aid and pharmacy, multi-level parking, cloak rooms, tourist information booths, AC dormitories and waiting lounges and sniffer dogs. About 1,900 buses could ply from the terminus A and it will remain operational for 24 hours.

This international AC bus stand was a project under public private partnership. Under which Google was Given  a responsibility  to make this Bus Terminal.

Filmmaking
2017 Punjabi film Dushman was shot in this bus stand by director Mahesh Bhatt with actors Gulshan Grover, Jashan Singh, Kartar Cheema and Sakshi.

Old bus stand

Old Bus Stand was located on Phase 8 (Sector 62) of Mohali illegally on the land of City Center Mohali owned by Greater Mohali Area Development Authority. In April 2014, GMADA dug up the approach road and the parking bays of the old bus stand. It was always in dirty condition with broken infrastructure. This bus stand was converted to a local bus service station. There are 14 local bus routes decided by Mohali Municipal Corporation.

See also
 Chandigarh Airport
 Mohali

References

Mohali
Bus stations in Punjab, India
Buildings and structures in Mohali